The Clock Tower of Korçë is a historic Ottoman clock tower dating from the 18th century and recently reconstructed. It is situated in the Old Bazaar of Korçë, Albania.

The clock tower was built in 1784 after an agreement between Muslim Albanians and Orthodox Moscopolans (Moscopole was a centre of the Aromanian minority in Albania), and was part of the Mosque Complex of Iliaz Hodja built in 1490.

The tower was made of stone and had a typical Ottoman style. It was destroyed during the communist dictatorship of Enver Hoxha due to an earthquake on May 21, 1960.

Sources 
 

Ottoman clock towers
Towers completed in 1784
Ottoman architecture in Albania
Buildings and structures in Korçë
1784 establishments in the Ottoman Empire
 2016